The 1933 Wellington City mayoral election was part of the New Zealand local elections held that same year. In 1933, elections were held for the Mayor of Wellington plus other local government positions including the fifteen city councillors, also elected biannually. Thomas Hislop, the incumbent Mayor sought re-election and retained office unopposed with no other candidates emerging. The polling was conducted using the standard first-past-the-post electoral method.

Background
The Labour Party chose not to stand a candidate for the mayoralty and decided to put all its resources in to winning a majority on the council, thinking this was the best way to achieve their goals. Labour actually polled more votes than the conservative Citizens' Association, but won fewer seats by virtue of most Labour votes being won by several popular candidates with the rest of the ticket trailing well behind them, whilst the Citizens' vote was far more evenly spread among its candidates. This was to be the first of five local elections where Labour won a majority of votes but did not gain control of the council. However Labour did manage to carry on momentum to win a by-election later in the year and thereby increase their representation.

Councillor results

Notes

References

Mayoral elections in Wellington
1933 elections in New Zealand
Politics of the Wellington Region
1930s in Wellington